Pimenta is a genus of flowering plants in the myrtle family, Myrtaceae described as a genus in 1821. It is native to Central and South America, Mexico, and the West Indies.

Well-known species include allspice (P. dioica) and the West Indian bay tree (P. racemosa). The name is mostly probably derived from the Portuguese word "pimenta", with the same meaning of the Spanish word pimienta, meaning "peppercorn." It refers to the berries of P. dioica.

Species

References

External links

 
Neotropical realm flora